Paralacydes ramosa is a moth of the family Erebidae. It was described by George Hampson in 1907. It is found in Malawi, Mozambique, South Africa, Tanzania and Zimbabwe.

References

Spilosomina
Moths described in 1907
Moths of Sub-Saharan Africa